Markov chain geostatistics uses Markov chain spatial models, simulation algorithms and associated spatial correlation measures (e.g.,  transiogram) based on the Markov chain random field theory, which extends a single Markov chain into a multi-dimensional random field for geostatistical modeling. A Markov chain random field is still a single spatial Markov chain. The spatial Markov chain moves or jumps in a space and decides its state at any unobserved location through interactions with its nearest known neighbors in different directions. The data interaction process can be well explained as a local sequential Bayesian updating process within a neighborhood. Because single-step transition probability matrices are difficult to estimate from sparse sample data and are impractical in representing the complex spatial heterogeneity of states, the transiogram, which is defined as a transition probability function over the distance lag, is proposed as the accompanying spatial measure of Markov chain random fields.

References 

 Li, W. 2007. Markov chain random fields for estimation of categorical variables. Math. Geol., 39(3): 321–335.
 Li, W. et al. 2015. Bayesian Markov chain random field cosimulation for improving land cover classification accuracy. Math. Geosci., 47(2): 123–148. 
 Li, W., and C. Zhang. 2019. Markov chain random fields in the perspective of spatial Bayesian networks and optimal neighborhoods for simulation of categorical fields. Computational Geosciences, 23(5): 1087-1106. 
 http://gisweb.grove.ad.uconn.edu/weidong/Markov_chain_spatial_statistics.htm

Geostatistics
Interpolation
Markov models